Larry Fotine (1911 - November 1990) was an American jazz pianist, songwriter and producer.  He was born Larry Fotinakis, or more accurately Lawrence Constantine Fotinakis. Fotine was a self-taught musician. He led an orchestra in the early 1930s and from 1948 to 1954. Between these periods, he concentrated on arranging, including for bandleader Sammy Kaye. After the orchestra projects, Fotine recorded with his new band, Beale Street Buskers, and returned to arranging, this time for Lawrence Welk. Later, he composed for Buttons and Rusty cartoons, and wrote music theory books.

Discography
 Plain Vanilla (LP) with the Beale Street Buskers
 Plain Vanilla (EP) with the Beale Street Buskers (1959)
 Blue Ha Ha / Phantasmagoria (single) (1977)

Song writing
 "Honestly, I Love You" (1947)
 "You Were Only Fooling (While I Was Falling In Love)" (1947) with words by William E. Faber & Fred Meadows

References

1911 births
1990 deaths
American jazz pianists
American male pianists
American male jazz musicians
20th-century American male musicians